The 1993 New Mexico Lobos football team was an American football team that represented the University of New Mexico in the Western Athletic Conference (WAC) during the 1993 NCAA Division I-A football season.  In their second season under head coach Dennis Franchione, the Lobos compiled a 6–5 record (4–4 against WAC opponents) and outscored opponents by a total of 335 to 256. 

The team's statistical leaders included Stoney Case with 2,490 passing yards and 84 points scored, Winslow Oliver with 648 rushing yards, and Carl Winston with 766 receiving yards.

Schedule

Roster

References

New Mexico
New Mexico Lobos football seasons
New Mexico Lobos football